Charles Keith Reyes Jensen (born January 7, 1988) is a Filipino-American former basketball player who last played for the CLS Knights Indonesia of the ASEAN Basketball League (ABL).

Professional career

PBA
Jensen was selected 8th overall in the 2012 PBA draft by Barangay Ginebra San Miguel.

Jensen would later be traded in the season from Ginebra to Barako Bull for Josh Urbiztondo.

On June 20, 2014 Keith Jensen was traded to GlobalPort Batang Pier in exchange for RR Garcia.

On May 11, 2016, Jensen was traded to the Star Hotshots along with Jonathan Uyloan for center Yousef Taha and for Sophomore Ronald Pascual. However, Jensen did not play a single game for the Hotshots, and on July 30, 2016, he announced that he will be leaving the team to go home to San Diego, where Jensen explains that he will address some personal matters.

ABL
On February 1, 2018, Jensen was signed by ASEAN Basketball League (ABL) club CLS Knights Indonesia, replacing Rudy Lingganay as the team's ASEAN Heritage Import.

PBA career statistics

Correct as of 2016

Season-by-season averages

|-
| align=left | 
| align=left | Barangay Ginebra / Barako Bull
| 31 || 12.6 || .364 || .242 || .562 || 2.1 || .5 || .1 || .1 || 3.1
|-
| align=left | 
| align=left | Barako Bull
| 32 || 16.3 || .478 || .383 || .684 || 1.9 || 1.0 || .2 || .1 || 6.0
|-
| align=left | 
| align=left | GlobalPort
| 34 || 20.9 || .410 || .284 || .500 || 3.5 || .9 || .4 || .2 || 6.0
|-
| align=left | 
| align=left | GlobalPort
| 28 || 25.0 || .353 || .270 || .705 || 3.4 || 1.3 || 1.0 || .6 || 6.9
|-class=sortbottom
| align=center colspan=2 | Career
| 125 || 18.6 || .402 || .299 || .642 || 2.7 || .9 || .4 || .2 || 5.5

References

External links
NYU profile

1988 births
Living people
American men's basketball players
ASEAN Basketball League players
Barako Bull Energy players
Barangay Ginebra San Miguel draft picks
Barangay Ginebra San Miguel players
Basketball players from San Francisco
Filipino expatriate basketball people in Indonesia
Filipino men's basketball players
NorthPort Batang Pier players
NYU Violets men's basketball players
Small forwards
American sportspeople of Filipino descent
Citizens of the Philippines through descent